Bernard Lee (1908–1981) was an English actor.

Bernard Lee may also refer to:
 Bernard Lee (poker player) (born 1970), American poker player
 Bernard Lee (activist), member of the Southern Christian Leadership Conference (SCLC) during the 1960s Civil Rights Movement
Barney Lee, Scottish footballer

See also
 Bernard Warburton-Lee (1895–1940), Welsh recipient of the Victoria Cross